DESTINY+ (Demonstration and Experiment of Space Technology for INterplanetary voYage with Phaethon fLyby and dUst Science) is a planned mission to flyby the  Geminids meteor shower parent body 3200 Phaethon, as well as various minor bodies originating from the "rock comet". The spacecraft is being developed by the Japanese space agency JAXA, and will demonstrate advanced technologies for future deep space exploration. As of 2020, DESTINY+ is planned to be launched in 2024.

Overview 
DESTINY+ will be launched from Uchinoura Space Center by an Epsilon S launch vehicle into low Earth orbit, and will spend 1.5 years raising its orbit with ion engines. A lunar flyby (at ~) will accelerate the probe into an interplanetary orbit. During this cruise time it will fly by a few near Earth objects for study, including the transition body 3200 Phaethon in 2028, as well as measure interplanetary and interstellar dust.

The probe's ion engines have the capability to perform another orbit transfer to study additional objects.

Objectives 
DESTINY+ will be a technology demonstrator to further improve operations of low cost solar electric propulsion in deep space. It will also demonstrate innovative light-weight solar array panel technology. The scientific aspect of this mission is to understand origin and nature of dusts, which are key sources of organic compounds to Earth. It will also observe dusts from comet/asteroid 3200 Phaethon using a dust analyzer and will map its surface using a multiband telescopic camera to understand the mechanisms of dust ejection.

Spacecraft 
DESTINY+ will use ultra light-weight solar panels and heat-actuated folding radiators, along with compact avionics. The spacecraft is designed to tolerate a radiation dose up to approximately 30 krad by using a 3 mm aluminum shield.

Propulsion 
The spacecraft will be propelled by four μ10 solar electric ion engines, as used by Hayabusa and Hayabusa2, but while its predecessors operated only up to three engines simultaneously, DESTINY+ will use all four simultaneously  for a total thrust of 40 mN (specific impulse: 3000 seconds; acceleration: 83 μm/s2; power: 1670 watts.)

Payload 
DESTINY PLUS will cary three scientific instruments:

 DESTINY Dust Analyzer (DDA) — The DESTINY Dust Analyzer (2.7 kg) will be provided by the German Aerospace Center (DLR), and is being developed by the University of Stuttgart.
 Telescopic Camera for Phaethon (TCAP) — The telescopic camera has a mass of 15.8 kg.
 Multiband Camera for Phaethon (MCAP) — The multiband camera has a mass of 3.5 kg and will detect light in 390 nm, 550 nm, 700 nm, 850 nm wavelengths.

See also 

 Lucy – NASA mission to flyby multiple Jupiter trojans
 OKEANOS – proposed JAXA Jupiter trojan flyby mission using solar sail/solar electric propulsion hybrid
 OSIRIS-REx – NASA sample-return mission to the carbonaceous asteroid 101955 Bennu
 Rosetta – ESA mission to comet 67P/Churyumov–Gerasimenko

References

External links 
 Official project site 

Missions to asteroids
Missions to comets
Japanese space probes
2024 in spaceflight
Proposed space probes